Rue Adolphe Mille is a street in the 19th arrondissement of Paris, near the parc de la Villette, the Conservatoire de Musique et de Danse and the Cité de la Musique.

History
Previously  'impasse de Dépotoir'  ("dead end of the Dump"), and in one extremity  'rue du Dépotoir.'  Once led to a former plaster pit-mine reemployed as a garbage dump.

Present Name
Adolphe Auguste Mille (1812–1894), general inspector of the Department of  'ponts et Chaussées'  (bridges and streets), civil engineer for the city of Paris, creator of the  'dépotoire municipale'  (municipal dump). Was also an activist for the re-use of Paris' sewage for local agriculture.

Transportation
The nearest stations of the Paris Métro are Ourcq and Porte de Pantin, on Line 5.

Adolphe Mille, rue